Petr Dlask (born 20 October 1976) is a Czech former cyclo-cross and road cyclist.

Major results

1997–1998
 3rd  UCI Under-23 World Championships
1998-1999
 3rd Ziklokross Igorre
1999–2000
 1st  National Championships
2000–2001
 1st  National Championships
 2nd  UCI World Championships
 UCI World Cup
2nd Heusden-Zolder
2nd Zeddam
3rd Pontchâteau
3rd Leudelange
2002–2003
 1st  National Championships
 1st Overall Budvar Cup
2003–2004
 Budvar Cup
1st Hlinsko
2004–2005
 Budvar Cup
2nd Mladá Boleslav
2nd Plzen
2005–2006
 1st  National Championships
 1st Overall Budvar Cup
1st Loštice
1st Mladá Boleslav
1st Hlinsko
1st Plzen
 UCI World Cup
2nd Tábor
2nd Igorre
3rd Kalmthout
 3rd Azencross
2006–2007
 1st  National Championships
 UCI World Cup
2nd Hofstade
2nd Hoogerheide
 3rd Veghel-Eerde
2007–2008
 Toi Toi Cup
2nd Uničov
2008–2009
 Toi Toi Cup
1st Hlinsko
2nd Holé Vrchy
2nd Uničov
3rd Louny
 1st Velka cena skupiny CEZ
 3rd Grand Prix Olomouc
2009–2010
 2nd National Championships
 Toi Toi Cup
3rd Hlinsko
3rd Podbořany
3rd Stříbro
2010–2011
 Toi Toi Cup
3rd Louny
2011–2012
 Toi Toi Cup
1st Loštice
2nd Mnichovo Hradiště
2nd Kolín
3rd Stříbro
 1st Grand Prix Julien Cajot
 2nd Podbrezova
2012–2013
 1st Grand Prix Möbel Alvisse
 Toi Toi Cup
3rd Hlinsko

References

External links

1976 births
Living people
Czech male cyclists
Cyclo-cross cyclists